Hickory Ground, also known as Otciapofa (or Odshiapofa, Ocheopofau, and Ocheubofau) is an historic Upper Muscogee Creek tribal town and an archaeological site in Elmore County, Alabama near Wetumpka.  It is known as Oce Vpofa in the Muscogee language; the name derives from oche-ub,"hickory" and po-fau, "among". It is best known for serving as the last capital of the National Council of the Creek Nation, prior to the tribe being moved to the Indian Territory in the 1830s.  It was added to the National Register of Historic Places on March 10, 1980.

Archaeological site
The 33-acre archaeological site, (1EE89), is outside Wetumpka on the lower Coosa River, north of where it joins the Tallapoosa River. It is a former village with a ceremonial ground, burial grounds, and refuse sites.

History
Hickory Ground, or Otciapofa, was established by Muscogee Creeks from Little Tulsa, located on the Coosa River. The site was documented during historic times by William Bartram in the 1770s and Benjamin Hawkins in 1799. The town was home to several thousand Muscogee and served as the last capital of the National Council of the Creek Nation from 1802 until 1814.  During the Creek War, the inhabitants who were not fighting in the war were confined at nearby Fort Jackson.  After the end of the war, they were allowed to resettle the site and remained there until 1832, when they were forcibly removed to the Indian Territory.

The site was rediscovered in 1968 by archaeologist David Chase of Auburn University.   The rediscovery was not made public until much later, when plans to build apartments on the site were announced.  Through the efforts of the Alabama Historical Commission and the Poarch Band of Creek Indians, the site was acquired in early 1980 through matching funds of $165,000 from the United States Department of the Interior and tax break incentives for the previous owner.  Excavations in 1988 and 1991 found evidence of occupation at the site during five distinct cultural periods, ranging from the Early Archaic (8000–6000 B.C.) to the historic Muscogee occupation.

The members of Otciapofa tribal town formed part of the Muscogee Creek Confederacy in Alabama, prior to their forced removal to Indian Territory during the 1830s. After resettling in Indian Territory, the members of Hickory Ground established another town of that name near Henryetta, Oklahoma. Chitto Harjo belonged to new Hickory Ground, where the Crazy Snake Uprising of 1901 was launched.

Controversy
In August 1980, the property was granted to the Poarch Band.  It was placed under a 20-year easement that limited development of the property.  The site became part of the Poarch Band's reservation lands in 1984, when they became a federally recognized tribe.   Following the expiration of the easement, the Poarch built a Native American bingo hall at the site from 2001–02, which required the excavation of the bingo hall site and exhumation of Muscogee graves found there.  The Muscogee (Creek) Nation of Oklahoma called construction at the site "deplorable" and claimed that many burials were disturbed during the initial building phase.  This commercial development of the site for a bingo hall was also opposed by other tribes, from both inside and outside the state; the Alabama Historical Commission; Alabama's delegation in the House of Representatives, which introduced legislation in a failed attempt to stop it; and roughly 50 Poarch members, who wrote letters to the Alabama Historical Commission.

The July 2012 announcement of a $246 million expansion to create a 20-story hotel and casino at the site caused further outcry from the Muscogee Creek Nation and the threat of legal action.  The Poarch denied that the historic site itself was affected by their development, stating in a news release that it was "protected land that is not part of a casino expansion."  The dispute over the development of Hickory Ground is part of a wider disagreement between the Poarch Band and the Oklahoma Muscogee; some in the Oklahoma tribe view themselves as 'traditionalists' and see the Poarch Band, who stayed behind in Alabama when the rest of the Muscogee were removed during the Trail of Tears, as being "questionable Indians".

The Montgomery Advertiser's article of August 21, 2012, stated:  Robert McGhee, a member of the Poarch Band tribal council gave no indication that the group  planned to halt construction and disagreed with Tiger's charge that the group lacked respect for cultural values.  "We have taken great care to honor history and preserve the past while ensuring the future for our tribe," he responded by email to the Advertiser.  "It is unfortunate that neither the issue nor our response to it was portrayed accurately, but we understand that these centuries-old wounds are deep and the hurt that resulted from tribes being forcibly removed from the Southeast still remains."

On October 12, 2012, the Inter-Tribal Council of the Five Civilized Tribes, including the Chickasaw, Choctaw, Cherokee, Muscogee (Creek) and Seminole Nations, unanimously adopted a resolution supporting efforts to halt the desecration of Hickory Ground.

On December 12, 2012, the Muscogee Creek Nation and the Hickory Ground Tribal Town filed a federal lawsuit in the U.S. District Court for the Middle District of Alabama to stop the casino development.  The lawsuit alleges that the excavation of Muscogee Creek human remains and funerary objects from Hickory Ground violated the Native American Graves Protection and Repatriation Act (NAGPRA) and other federal laws.

The multi-story hotel is now open on the site.

See also
 Four Mothers Society
 Stomp dance

Notes

References

External links
 Back to Nature: The Battle for Hickory Ground, video by Sterlin Harjo with members of Hickory Ceremonial Ground

Muscogee tribal towns
National Register of Historic Places in Elmore County, Alabama
Archaeological sites on the National Register of Historic Places in Alabama
Former populated places in Alabama
Populated places on the National Register of Historic Places in Alabama
Native American history of Alabama
Elmore County, Alabama